Travis Roche (born June 17, 1978) is a Canadian former professional ice hockey defenseman who last played for EHC Black Wings Linz of the Austrian Hockey League (EBEL).

Playing career
An offensive defenceman, Roche played two seasons for the University of North Dakota Fighting Sioux. The Sioux defeated The University of Maine and also Boston College in the Frozen Four (held in Providence, Rhode Island) to capture an NCAA title in his first season of play in the 1999–2000 season, and Roche was named to the WCHA All-Tournament Team.

The following season (the final season at “old” Ralph Engelstad Arena), the team captured the MacNaughton Cup as the WCIIA League Regular Season Champion with an 18–4–6 record. The team lost the Final Five Championship game to Saint Cloud State 6–5 in overtime, and the Sioux were defeated by Boston College 3–2 in the Frozen Four title game, with Roche named to the WCHA All-Tournament team, the NCAA Frozen Four All-Tournament Team and was honored as an NCAA West First Team All-American. Roche holds Fighting Sioux single game records for goals by a defenceman (3), points by a defenceman (6), and assists by a defenceman.

For his collegiate career, Roche appeared in 88 games, scoring 17 goals, passing out 60 assists, and scoring 77 points.

He was signed to a two-season contract by the Minnesota Wild on April 8, 2001, one day after the end of the Sioux's 2001 national championship run, appearing in  the final game of the Wild's 2000–2001 season. He joined their AHL affiliate, the Houston Aeros for the better part of the 2001–02 season, finishing with 34 points (13G-21A) in 60 games while playing a handful of games with the parent club in Minnesota.

Roche returned to Houston for the better part of the 2002–03 season, establishing career highs in goals (14), assists (34) and points (48) and was a key player in the team's run to the 2003 Calder Cup title. In 2003–04, Roche spent the majority of season with the Houston while playing a handful of games with the Wild.

Roche signed with the Atlanta Thrashers in the summer 2004 and competed for the club's AHL affiliate Chicago Wolves for in the 2004–2005 and 2005–2006 seasons, and was named AHL First Team All-Star in 2005 with the team advancing to the AHL Finals.

Roche signed as a free agent with the Phoenix Coyotes in the summer of 2006, and after a strong training camp for head coach Wayne Gretzky, and with 17 games played, one goal and nine assists for the team's AHL affiliate, the San Antonio Rampage, Roche was called up by the Coyotes for the remainder of the 2006–2007 NHL season. Roche established NHL career highs for games played (50), goals (6), assists (13), points (19) and PIM (22) and also led the team in plus/minus ratio (+2). His first NHL goal was scored on Miikka Kiprusoff of the Calgary Flames on December 16, 2006. He had a multiple point game two weeks later, and he had a game-winning goal against the Los Angeles Kings on January 20, 2007.

Roche represented Canada at the Spengler Cup in 2009, 2010 and 2012, and was also named to the 2013 roster. He was also named to Team Canada for the 2011 tournament, but did not play due to injury. At the 2010 tournament, he was named one of the tournament's best defencemen after Team Canada won silver. He won gold with Team Canada at the 2012 tournament.

Roche appeared in 60 games over four NHL seasons between 2000–01 and 2006–07, where he collected 6 goals and 14 assists for 20 points and was assessed 24 PIM.

On August 11, 2014, after six seasons with SC Bern in the Swiss National League A, Roche left as a free agent to sign in the Swedish Hockey League on a one-year contract with Modo Hockey.

Personal life
He and his wife, Darcie live in the St. Paul, Minnesota area in the off-season. He  is from Grande Cache, Alberta and was raised in Whitecourt, Alberta

Career statistics

Awards and honors

Transactions
 April 8, 2001 - Minnesota Wild: signed as a free agent
 July 14, 2004 - Atlanta Thrashers: signed as a free agent
 July 20, 2006 - Phoenix Coyotes: signed as a free agent

References

External links

1978 births
Canadian ice hockey defencemen
Chicago Wolves players
EHC Black Wings Linz players
Houston Aeros (1994–2013) players
Ice hockey people from Alberta
Living people
Minnesota Wild players
Modo Hockey players
North Dakota Fighting Hawks men's ice hockey players
People from Whitecourt
Phoenix Coyotes players
San Antonio Rampage players
SC Bern players
Undrafted National Hockey League players
Canadian expatriate ice hockey players in Austria
Canadian expatriate ice hockey players in Switzerland
Canadian expatriate ice hockey players in Sweden
AHCA Division I men's ice hockey All-Americans
NCAA men's ice hockey national champions